Caffery is a surname. Notable people with the surname include:

Chris Caffery (born 1967), heavy metal guitarist, a member of Savatage and the Trans-Siberian Orchestra
Donelson Caffery (1835–1906), U.S. Senator from Louisiana, soldier in the American Civil War, sugar plantation owner
Ernie Caffery (born 1986), former Irish Fine Gael politician and publican
Jack Caffery (track and field athlete) (1879–1919), Canadian track and field athlete, competed in the 1908 Summer Olympics
Jack Caffery (ice hockey) (1934–1992), professional ice hockey player
Jefferson Caffery (1887–1974), U.S. ambassador to several countries between 1926 and 1955
Jim Caffery (1872–1918), former Australian rules footballer
Patrick T. Caffery (1932–2013), attorney and politician from New Iberia, Louisiana, grandson of Donelson Caffery
Terry Caffery (1949–2022), a retired ice hockey forward with the New England Whalers of the World Hockey Association

See also
Cafferty
McCafferty
McCaffery